The 1896 U.S. Open was the second U.S. Open, held July 18 at Shinnecock Hills Golf Club in Southampton, New York. James Foulis won his only major title, three strokes ahead of runner-up Horace Rawlins, the defending champion. Like the first Open, it was a sideshow to the U.S. Amateur. However, there were 35 entrants and 28 finished the 36 holes.

Before play began, several players signed a petition stating that they would not play if John Shippen, an African-American, and Oscar Bunn, a Native American, were allowed to play. The petition was denied, however, and the players relented. Shippen, a caddie at Shinnecock Hills, shot an opening round of 78, which placed him just two back of leader Joe Lloyd. He was in a position to win the championship until an eleven on the 13th hole of the final round, and finished tied for sixth.

Foulis, the third-place finisher in the inaugural U.S. Open the year before, recorded rounds of 78-74 to prevail by three over Rawlins. Foulis' 74 set a record that was not broken until 1903, after the rubber-core ball had come into use.

At , Shinnecock Hills played as the shortest course in U.S. Open history. Its next U.S. Open was 90 years later, in 1986.

Past champion in the field 

Source:

First round
Saturday, July 18, 1896 (morning)

Source:

Final round
Saturday, July 18, 1896 (afternoon)

Source:

Amateurs: Smith (158), Whigham (159), Macdonald (83, WD).

References

External links
USGA Championship Database
USOpen.com – 1896

U.S. Open (golf)
Golf in New York (state)
Sports in Long Island
U.S. Open (golf)
U.S. Open (golf)
U.S. Open (golf)
U.S. Open (golf)